Mark Anthony Hogan (January 27, 1931 – February 12, 2017) was the 37th Lieutenant Governor of Colorado. He was a Democrat and served from 1967 to 1971 under Republican Governor John Arthur Love.
 
Hogan graduated from Georgetown University in 1952 and served in the United States Navy from 1952 to 1954. He settled in Denver, Colorado and became a realtor. He served two terms in the state legislature.

In 1970, Hogan was the unsuccessful Democratic nominee for Governor of Colorado. He died in 2017.

References

1931 births
2017 deaths
Lieutenant Governors of Colorado
Colorado Democrats
Politicians from Denver
Politicians from Chicago
Georgetown University alumni